John Elly (also Ellis) DD (1581–1639) was a Canon of Windsor from 1623 to 1639.

Career

He was educated at Exeter College, Oxford and Merton College, Oxford where he graduated BA 1602, MA in 1607, BD and DD in 1633.

He was appointed:
Rector of Lapworth, Warwick 1613
Vicar of Elham, Kent 1612 - 1614
Vicar of Ruislip 1633 - 1639
Vicar of Isleworth 1637 - 1639

He was appointed to the twelfth stall in St George's Chapel, Windsor Castle in 1623, and held the stall until 1639.

Notes 

1581 births
1639 deaths
Canons of Windsor
Alumni of Merton College, Oxford